Richard Waters (September 19, 1935 – July 4, 2013) was an American painter and sculptor most notable for inventing the waterphone.

Waters grew up on the Mississippi Gulf Coast. He graduated from the University of Southern Mississippi in 1961. In 1965, Waters received his MFA from the California College of the Arts.

References

External links

1935 births
2013 deaths
American artists
Inventors of musical instruments
20th-century American inventors
California College of the Arts alumni
University of Southern Mississippi alumni